Lieutenant General Richard Friedrich Patrick Felton,  is a former British Army officer who served as Director-General of the Defence Safety Authority from 2017 to 2019.

Military career
Felton was commissioned into the Royal Corps of Transport on 6 September 1985. He became Commanding Officer of 9 Regiment Army Air Corps in April 2004, Chief of Staff of 1st (United Kingdom) Armoured Division in April 2007 and Commander of 4th Mechanized Brigade in January 2009. It was in this role that he was deployed as Commander of Task Force Helmand in April 2010. He went on to be Chief of Joint Forces Operations at Joint Forces Headquarters in March 2011 and Commander of Joint Helicopter Command in March 2014. He became Director-General of the Defence Safety Authority in April 2017.

References

|-

British Army Air Corps officers
British Army lieutenant generals
British Army personnel of the Iraq War
British Army personnel of the War in Afghanistan (2001–2021)
British military personnel of The Troubles (Northern Ireland)
Commanders of the Order of the British Empire
Recipients of the Commendation for Valuable Service
Living people
Year of birth missing (living people)